Akhtaruzzaman Mia is a Bangladesh Nationalist Party politician and the former Member of Parliament of Dinajpur-4.

Career
Mia was elected to parliament from Dinajpur-4 as a Bangladesh Nationalist Party candidate in 2001.

References

Bangladesh Nationalist Party politicians
Living people
8th Jatiya Sangsad members
People from Dinajpur District, Bangladesh
Year of birth missing (living people)